Thomas Halpin (May 17, 1892 – September 9, 1960) was an American middle distance runner who competed in the 1912 Summer Olympics.

References

1892 births
1960 deaths
American male middle-distance runners
Olympic track and field athletes of the United States
Athletes (track and field) at the 1912 Summer Olympics
20th-century American people